Denton Burn is an area located in Central Newcastle, approximately  to the west of the city centre of Newcastle upon Tyne in England, United Kingdom. It is officially designated a suburb of the city, where it is linked to Carlisle by the A69 and A1 roads. The West Road also runs to the north of Denton Burn allowing access to the city centre and also to the junction which leads to the A69 road and A1 road.

Wall

A small section of Hadrian's Wall is located in the suburb. This is the first substitutional length of wall that can be seen west of Newcastle. It was depicted in a drawing in 1863 with an apple tree growing on it. The site also contains the remains of a turret. A milecastle is presumed buried beneath a modern housing development. The turret and attached wall are maintained as a single property by English Heritage (known as "Denton Hall Turret").

Education

There are three schools located in Denton Burn, St. Bedes RC Primary School, Broadwood Primary School and St. Cuthbert's High School. Other amenities like the library, stores and field are essential to the area.

References

Districts of Newcastle upon Tyne